Bhakkar Tehsil , is an administrative subdivision, (tehsil), of Bhakkar District in the Punjab province of Pakistan. The Bhakkar city is the headquarters of the tehsil.

Administration
The tehsil of Bhakkar is subdivided into 26 Union Councils. Union council Sial is in Bhakkar District. It is situated on the western side of Bhakkar city, nearly a six kilometer distance from city. it is situated near the river Indus.

History
During British rule, Bhakkar (larger in area today) was a tehsil of Mianwali District. The population, according to the 1901 census, was 125,803, compared with 119,219 in 1891. The 1901 census revealed that the tehsil contained the town of Bhakkar (population, 5,312) and 196 villages. The land revenue and cesses amounted in 1903/4 to 170,000.

In 1982, the tehsil of Bhakkar was split from Mianwali and became the current district of Bhakkar; this district has been subdivided into four tehsils one of which is the current tehsil of Bhakkar.

References

Tehsils of Punjab, Pakistan
Bhakkar District